Majid (born 1975) is a Danish rapper of Moroccan-Berber origin. Residing in Avedøre near Copenhagen, Denmark he was a contributor to Danish act Outlandish, which also hails from Brøndby Strand. Majid contributed to their tours and performed as a special guest in the warm-up for their acts.

In addition to his contributions to Outlandish, he released a solo album Life Knowledge Poetry in 2004.

Discography

Albums
2004: Life Knowledge Poetry
Track list
"Intro"
"First Breath"
"Life"
"Past, Present, Future"
"My Way"
"What We Are"
"Without U"
"Interlude"
"Knowledge" (feat. Carolus)
"Where We're From"
"Still Burning"
"My Struggle"
"Somebody to Lean On" (feat. Burhan G)
"New Love"
"El Campo" (feat. Outlandish & Burhan G)
"Poetry"

Collaborations / tracks with Outlandish

Songs / videography
2004: "My Struggle" 
2004: "New Love"
2007: "Lean On Me" (featuring Burhan G)

References

External links
Majod MySpace site
Majid page on LastFM

1975 births
Living people
Danish rappers
Danish people of Moroccan-Berber descent
People from Brøndby Municipality